Big Moves is the major label debut album by American rap group The Delinquents, released May 20, 1997 on Priority Records. The Delinquents have two members: G-Stack and V-Dal. The album was produced by Ali Malek, Chucksta, Filthy Rich, Mike D, One Drop Scott, Sonny B, Terry T and Young B, and executive produced by G-Stack and V-Dal. The album peaked at number 43 on the Billboard Top Heatseekers and at number 84 on the Billboard Top R&B/Hip-Hop Albums. It features guest performances by Agerman and Bart of 3X Krazy, as well as Gangsta P, The Dominion, Dolla Will, and Rame Royal (of Rhythm & Green). Dolla Will would later join Ant Banks' supergroup T.W.D.Y. on the album, Lead the Way.

Along with a single, a music video was released for the song, "Smooth Getaway" featuring Bart.

Track listing 
 "Playa's Intro" – 2:14 
 "Puttin' It Down" (featuring DT, Gangsta P & D.E.L.) – 4:56
 "We Bring tha Drama" – 4:00 
 "Cola Crunch" – 0:31 
 "Watch" – 4:14
 "Take Me Higher" – 4:14
 "True" (featuring DT & A.N.S. of The Dominion) – 2:45 
 "Fuck What Ya Heard" (featuring Agerman, Mike D & Y.G.T.O.) – 3:52
 "Will Rap For Food" (featuring Rame Royal & Prodigy of The Dominion) – 3:27
 "East Oakland West Coast" – 4:14 
 "My Bitch" – 0:20 
 "Sounds Like?" (featuring A.N.S. of The Dominion) – 4:00
 "Conversation" – 4:08 
 "Yo Lay He Do" – 4:13 
 "Smooth Getaway" (featuring Bart) – 4:20 
 "Big Licks" (featuring Harm) – 4:32 
 "Let Me Touch It" (featuring Dolla Will) – 3:41 
 "Outro" – 0:31

Chart history

Personnel 

 Sonny B - Producer
 Mike D - Producer, Performer, Mixing
 The Delinquents - Mixing
 DT - Performer
 Filthy Rich - Producer
 Brian Gardner - Mastering
 Glenn Jones - Executive Producer
 Keba Konte - Photography

 Ali Malek - Producer
 Adam Muñoz - Mixing
 One Drop Scott - Producer, Mixing
 Vidal Prevost - Executive Producer
 Prodigy - Performer
 Chuck Sta - Producer
 Terry T. - Producer
 Dolla Will - Performer

References

External links 
 [ Big Moves] at Allmusic
 Big Moves at Discogs
 Big Moves at Tower Records

1997 debut albums
The Delinquents (group) albums
Priority Records albums